The Kasmala is a river in Altai Krai, Russia.

The basin of the river is located in the Rebrikhinsky and Pavlovsky districts. Kasmala rural locality is named after the river.

Course 
The Kasmala is a left tributary of the Ob river. It has its sources in lake Seleznevo-Borovskoye, in a swampy area of the Ob Plateau. The river flows in a roughly northeastern direction. Finally it meets the left bank of the Ob at Kasmala,  from the Ob's mouth.

Tributaries  
The river is frozen between November and April.

See also
List of rivers of Russia

References

External links

Rivers of Altai Krai